Palula may refer to:

 Palula language, an Indo-Aryan language spoken in northern Pakistan
 Palula people, the ethnic group who speaks the language